Baudoin Tshitungi Dieudonne Kanda (born 17 April 1993) is a Romanian footballer of Congolese descent who plays as a midfielder for Dunărea Călărași.

Personal life
Kanda is of Congolese descent through his father who is a medical doctor at the Vitan Polyclinic. In 2008 when he was 15 years old, he was called up by coach Florin Cheran at Romania's under-15 national team, making him the first black Romanian footballer that represented the country internationally, regardless the age category.

Honours
Dunărea Călărași
Liga II: 2017–18
Liga III: 2014–15

References

External links
 
 

1993 births
Living people
Footballers from Bucharest
Romanian people of Democratic Republic of the Congo descent
Romanian footballers
Association football midfielders
Liga I players
Liga II players
Liga III players
FC Dunărea Călărași players
FC UTA Arad players
FCV Farul Constanța players
CS Concordia Chiajna players
FC Gloria Buzău players